Colby Minifie (born January 31, 1992) is an American actress. She began acting at the age of eleven and was a YoungArts scholar; she graduated from the City University of New York in 2014. She performed for four years with the National Dance Institute. She has appeared on and off Broadway, in television and in films.

Filmography

Film

Television

Theater

References

External links

1992 births
Living people
Actresses from New York (state)
American film actresses
American television actresses
City University of New York alumni
21st-century American actresses
American stage actresses